The Hoop and Grapes is a grade II listed pub at 80 Farringdon Street in the City of London.

Historic England notes that it was originally a terraced house, built in about 1720 for a vintner, and was converted to a pub in about 1832.

References

External links
 

Grade II listed pubs in the City of London
Farringdon, London